Salavan (also Saravane, Lao: ສາລະວັນ) is a province of Laos, located in the south of the country. Its earlier name was Saravan which was changed by Thai to Salavan in 1828. It was part of the Champasak Kingdom in an area known as Muang Mang inhabited by minorities of Mon-Khmer groups.

The province borders Savannakhét province to the north, Vietnam to the east, Sekong province to the southeast, Champasak province to the south and Thailand to the west. The central part of the province is located on the Bolaven Plateau, which is a key agricultural area with Arabica coffee as the dominant cash crop. The western part of Salavan province is delimited by the Mekong River while the eastern part is delimited by the Lao-Vietnamese border.

History
Approximately 1,500 years ago, a Mon-Khmer group, the Khom established settlements in what is now Salavan province. It came to be ruled by the Champa after the Cham people migrated from South China to the territory. Various kingdoms united into the Lan Xang under Fa Ngum in 1353. Between 1779 and 1893, the province was a Thai colony. In the 20th century, it became a French Protectorate under the Franco-Siamese Treaty of October 3, 1893. The province had 8 districts and 715 villages after the liberation of 1975.

In the Indochina war, Salavan town was subject to extensive depredation when its control frequently shifted between the Royal Forces and the Pathet Lao. It was subsequently rebuilt with brick masonry and timber buildings, coexisting with the few old buildings which survived the war.

Geography
The province borders Savannakhét province to the north, Vietnam to the east, Xekong province to the southeast, Champasak province to the south and Thailand to the west. Notable settlements in the province include Salavan, Muang Khongxedon, Ban Tha Kien, Ban D'Hon, Ban Phou Daotleng Noi, Ban La Khone Pheng, Ban Laongam, Ban Dong, Ban Lavang, Ban Nongbua, Ban Khanmakgnot, Ban Yon, Man Donmouang, Ban Napho, Ban Proy, Ban Tang-Un Tai, Choiavieng, Ban Ralao, Ban Kanay, Tavouc, Tala and A Boum.

The Saravan city is capital of the province is located on a bend of Se Don River, which flows through the province and eventually joins the Mekong River at Pakse. The city serves as a nerve center for supply of goods to the hinterland districts of the province. The city is the administrative, economic and cultural hub of the province. Subsequent to the extensive damage caused to the town during the 1971 Indochina war, it has been rebuilt as per modern urban planning concepts. Two French colonial buildings are still seen here. The market centre in the town is very colourful.

The lake has a few Siamese crocodiles (Khai in Lao). Nearby is a hill, Phu Katae at  where the CIA airstrip was once functional.

Its origin is volcanic with mountains and wide valleys. The central part of the province is located on the Bolaven Plateau, which is a key agricultural area with Arabica coffee as the dominant cash crop and other horticultural products which are exported. The western part of Salavan province is delimited by the Mekong river while the eastern part is delimited by the Lao-Vietnamese border. In addition to the Bolaven Plateau and the Mekong, the topography includes plains and a mountainous region near the border with Vietnam. The two protected areas in the province are the Xe Pian and Dong Ampham.

Access to the province is difficult as the road network is not in good condition, particularly during the monsoon rains.

Protected areas
The Xe Sap Important Bird Area (IBA) is situated within the Xe Xap National Biodiversity Conservation Area (NBCA) (113,000 ha), surpassing its boundaries. The IBA is part of two provinces, Salavan and Sekong. The habitat includes dry evergreen forest, pine forest, semi-evergreen forest, upper montane forest, and grassland. Two species of gymnosperm were noted: Fokienia hodginsii and Pinus dalatensis. Its avifauna includes Blyth's kingfisher (Alcedo hercules), yellow-billed nuthatch (Sitta solangiae), and Vietnamese crested argus (Rheinardia ocellata). There are several types of mammals, two types of primates, and one turtle species.

The "Mekong Channel from Phou Xiang Thong to Siphandon" IBA is 34,200 ha in size. There is a 10,000 ha overlap with the Phou Xiengthong National Biodiversity Conservation Area (NBCA is 120,000 ha in size). The IBA encompasses two provinces, Salavan and Champasak. Its topography is characterized by earth banks, rocky banks, rocky islands, seasonally flooded sandbars, low vegetated islands, rocky islets, sandy beaches, and sand bars. Notable avifauna is the last known nesting little terns (Sternula albifrons); there are also small pratincoles (Glareola lactea), river lapwings (Vanellus duvaucelii), wire-tailed swallows (Hirundo smithii), and river terns (Sterna aurantia).

The Phou Xiang Thong IBA (36,650 hectare) is situated within the Phou Xiengthong NBCA (120,000 hectare). The IBA encompasses two provinces, Salavan and Champasak. Its topography is characterized by low hills, lowlands, rivers, and seasonal streams. Its habitat contains dry deciduous tropical forest, moist deciduous tropical forest, semi-evergreen tropical rain forest, mixed deciduous forest, dry dipterocarp forest, and open rocky savanna. Notable avifauna include Siamese fireback (Lophura diardi), red-collared woodpecker (Picus rabieri), green peafowl (Pavo muticus), and grey-faced tit babbler (Macronous kelleyi).

Xe Bang Nouan (XBN) Protected Area was established on 29 October 1993 covering an area of 1260 km2, and extending over Salavan and Savanakhet provinces. The topography of the reserve lies in the elevation range of 200-1000m; has flat to gently rolling terrain below
400 m elevation in the north and south of the Bang Nouan River; the central part the river flows through gorges; and to the east of the hills is the wide valley of the river. The forests found are the evergreen, dry dipterocarp, mixed deciduous and other natural forest types, and about 87% of the area of the reserve is forested. Forest products of damar, fish and sticklac are exploited by the ethnic population living in the reserve for economic sustenance; they also have livestock and shifting cultivation practices.

Administrative divisions
The province is made up of the following eight districts:

Demographics
The population of the province as per the 2015 census was 396,942 distributed over eight districts. The ethnic groups in the province comprise the Tahoy, Pako, Katang, Kado, Suay, and Laven.

Economy
Salavan province is one of the most important coffee producing areas of Laos along with Champasak province and Sekong province. Arabica coffee and coffee beans are the products of the Bolaven Plateau which is an export revenue product and can also be bought in villages along the roads.

Landmarks
Katang village in Toomlarn District is known for silk weaving. Here the Lapup Festival is held in late February, when buffaloes are sacrificed. Hence, the festival is also called the Katu and Alak Buffalo Sacrifice. The village is located on the Ho Chi Minh Trail where UXOs are found and are a threat to the people. However, people still collect the war relics and sell them.

Tahoy town is where the Tahoy ethnic groups reside; there are about 30,000 of them. Their cultural practice involves shamanistic rituals combined with animism. During the festivals, people of the town erect totems made in the form of a diamond as a warning to outsiders not to enter the town. Tigers are a common sight in this town which keeps the people indoors during the night.

Tatlo on the Bolaven Plain is known for Katu and Alak villages, as well as a waterfall.

Culture
Lam Salavane is a Lao language folksong derived from Mon–Khmer styles.  It includes instrumental accompaniment of a drum, fiddle, flute, khene, lute, and other percussive instruments. Several television stations are available in Salavan.  Lao National Television broadcasts  TNL1 (from Vientiane, and TNL3 (from Vientiane. Salavan Media broadcasts four national channels TV-Veritas Channel 1, TV-Veritas Channel 2, TV-Veritas Channel 3, and TV-Veritas Channel 4.

References

Bibliography
 
 

 
Provinces of Laos
Populated places on the Mekong River